Graeme Maxton is a British climate change economist and writer.

Biography 
Maxton was born in Edinburgh, Scotland and currently lives in Asia. He is related to politicians John Maxton, the Lord Maxton, and the 1930s Leader of the Independent Labour Party James Maxton. Until 2018, he was the Secretary General of the Club of Rome based in Switzerland.  He was previously regional director of the Economist Intelligence Unit in Asia, worked for Booz Allen Hamilton, Citigroup and American Express and was a visiting professor at Cass Business School between 1988 and 2002.

Works 
Maxton is the co-author with Bernice Maxton-Lee of A Chicken can’t lay a Duck Egg: How COVID-19 can solve the climate crisis, (Changemakers Books 2020) and of Globaler Klimanotstand: Warum unser demokratisches System an seine Grenzen stößt (Komplett-Media 2020). Both books examine the causes of society's failure to respond to climate change and propose radical solutions to bring the pace of global warming under control. Maren Urner and Felix Austen were guest authors of the German book, which has also been published in Slovak. Maxton is also the author of the German best-seller Change! Warum wir eine radikale Wende brauchen. The book examines the link between the economic system and climate change and has also been published in English and Slovak.

Maxton is the co-author with Jorgen Randers of Reinventing Prosperity. The book has been published in German (" Ein Prozent ist genug", oekom 2016), Italian and Ukrainian.

Maxton is the sole author of The End of Progress, How Modern Economics Has Failed Us which was nominated for the Financial Times and Goldman Sachs Business Book of the Year Award. The book has been translated into Chinese, Czech, Romanian and German (Die Wachstumslüge), where it became a Spiegel top-20 best seller.

Maxton's books on the automotive industry, co-written with John Wormald, include Time for a Model Change, which was Cambridge University Press's Feature Book of the Year in 2004 and Driving Over a Cliff, also nominated for the Financial Times Business Book of the Year Award.

Maxton is a regular contributor to the South China Morning Post and a number of other online and print publications.

Maxton provided the afterword for 2021 book Wild Life about the Victorian nature writer from Swindon Richard Jefferies.

Bibliography 
 
 
 
 
 
 
 
 
 Die Wachstumslüge: Warum wir alle die Welt nicht länger Politikern und Ökonomen überlassen dürfen, Münchner Verlagsgruppe GmbH, 2012

References

Web sources
 
 * SRF Interview 2018 https://www.srf.ch/play/tv/sternstunde-philosophie/video/graeme-maxton-schafft-sich-die-menschheit-bald-ab?id=79350c4d-3c96-4885-8043-6d10b28c9f93
 
 
 
 
 
 https://www.komplett-media.de/de_globaler-klimanotstand_200454.html
 https://www.amazon.de/gp/bestsellers/books/189481/ref=pd_zg_hrsr_books Amazon.de best-seller list retrieved March 2020
 https://www.pro.sk/sliepka-nedokaze-zniest-kacacie-vajce
 https://www.amazon.com/Graeme-P.-Maxton/e/B001IXQ0L6%3Fref=dbs_a_mng_rwt_scns_share
 https://www.knihydobrovsky.cz/kniha/slepice-nedokaze-snest-kachni-vejce-292650905
 https://www.komplett-media.de/de_f*ck-the-system_200538.html
 https://www.amazon.com/Chicken-Cant-Lay-Duck-Egg/dp/1789047617/ref=sr_1_1?dchild=1&keywords=graeme+maxton&qid=1610414403&sr=8-1

External links 
 Official Website
 

Living people
British economists
Scottish economists
Academics of Bayes Business School
1960 births